Tribute, also known as Nora Roberts' Tribute, is a 2009 television film directed by Martha Coolidge starring Brittany Murphy and Jason Lewis. The film is based on the 2008 Nora Roberts novel of the same name. It is part of the Nora Roberts 2009 movie collection, which also includes Northern Lights, Midnight Bayou, and High Noon. The movie debuted April 11, 2009 on Lifetime.

Plot
The movie revolves around former child star Cilla McGowan (Murphy), who has found more satisfying work restoring old houses. In search of a normal life, Cilla buys her grandmother's farmhouse in Virginia's Shenandoah Valley, to rescue it from ruin.

Cilla's hope for serenity is soon eclipsed by haunting dreams of her famous grandmother, who died of a supposed overdose in the house, more than 30 years before. Cilla soon begins a romantic relationship with Ford Sawyer (Lewis), her handsome neighbor, who ultimately comforts and protects her when her dark dreams and family secrets turn into a real-life nightmare.

Cast
 Brittany Murphy as Cilla McGowan
 Jason Lewis as Ford Sawyer
 Christian Oliver as Steve Chensky
 Diana Scarwid as Cathy Morrow
 Tippi Hedren as Mrs. Hennessey
Tiffany Morgan as Janet
 Griff Furst as Brian Morrow
 Blake Nelson Boyd as Piano Player
Mark Wilson as Det. Alvin Wilson

Production
The film was executive produced by Stephanie Germain and Peter Guber, who also executive produced seven other Roberts films for Lifetime in 2007 and 2009.

Reception
The Movie Scene said the film "is sadly not as good as I hoped and suffers because certain elements of the storyline have been too embellished whilst others have been under explored. It is entertaining but almost in that it borders on the cheesily amusing rather than for being a tight and exciting thriller."

References

External links
  
 

2009 television films
2009 films
2009 romantic drama films
American romantic drama films
Films based on American novels
Films directed by Martha Coolidge
Lifetime (TV network) films
American thriller television films
2000s American films